Events in the year 1976 in Brazil.

Incumbents

Federal government
 President: General Ernesto Geisel 
 Vice President: 	General Adalberto Pereira dos Santos

Governors 
 Acre: vacant
 Alagoas: Divaldo Suruagy  
 Amazonas: Henoch da Silva Reis
 Bahia: Roberto Santos 
 Ceará: José Adauto Bezerra 
 Espírito Santo: Élcio Álvares 
 Goiás: Irapuan Costa Jr. 
 Maranhão: Oswaldo da Costa Nunes Freire  
 Mato Grosso: Jose Garcia Neto 
 Minas Gerais: Aureliano Chaves 
 Pará: Aloysio Chaves 
 Paraíba: Ivan Bichara 
 Paraná: Jaime Canet Júnior 
 Pernambuco: Francisco Moura Cavalcanti 
 Piauí: Dirceu Arcoverde 
 Rio de Janeiro: Floriano P. Faria Lima
 Rio Grande do Norte: Tarcisio de Vasconcelos Maia 
 Rio Grande do Sul: Sinval Sebastião Duarte Guazzelli 
 Santa Catarina: Antônio Carlos Konder Reis 
 São Paulo: Paulo Egídio Martins 
 Sergipe: José Rollemberg

Vice governors
 Acre: Omar Sabino de Paula 
 Alagoas: Antônio Gomes de Barro (until 12 September); vacant thereafter (from 12 September)
 Amazonas: João Bosco Ramos de Lima 
 Bahia: Edvaldo Brandão Correia 
 Ceará: José Waldemar de Alcântara e Silva 
 Espírito Santo: Carlos Alberto Lindenberg von Schilgen 
 Goiás: José Luís Bittencourt 
 Maranhão: José Duailibe Murad 
 Mato Grosso: Cássio Leite de Barros 
 Minas Gerais: Levindo Ozanam Coelho 
 Pará: Clovis Silva de Morais Rego 
 Paraíba: Dorgival Terceiro Neto 
 Paraná: Octávio Cesário Pereira Júnior 
 Pernambuco: Paulo Gustavo de Araújo Cunha 
 Piauí: Djalma Martins Veloso 
 Rio de Janeiro: vacant
 Rio Grande do Norte: Geraldo Melo 
 Rio Grande do Sul: José Augusto Amaral de Sousa 
 Santa Catarina: Marcos Henrique Büechler 
 São Paulo: Ferreira Filho 
 Sergipe: Antônio Ribeiro Sotelo

Events
formation of Banda Black Rio
dissolution of Centro de Ensino Unificado de Brasília Esporte Clube
dissolution of Associação Atlética Rodoviária

Births
 January 7 Alfonso Soriano footballer
 May 10 Rogério Oliveira da Costa born football (soccer) striker (d. 2006)
 June 2 Antônio Rodrigo Nogueira mixed martial artist
 June 20 Juliano Belletti footballer
 June 26 Wilson Lima politician and journalist
 July 3 Wanderlei Silva mixed martial artist
 July 17 Marcos Senna footballer
 August 29 Luana Piovani actress and model
 September 10 Gustavo Kuerten tennis player
 September 18 Ronaldo footballer
 October 7 Gilberto Silva football player
 October 10 Bob Burnquist, skateboarder
 October 24 Isabel Clark Ribeiro, snowboarder
 December 3 Marcos Denner footballer

Deaths
August 22 - Juscelino Kubitschek, President 1956-1961
December 6 - João Goulart, President 1961-1964

See also 
1976 in Brazilian football
1976 in Brazilian television

References

 
1970s in Brazil
Years of the 20th century in Brazil
Brazil
Brazil